Classics is the second full-length album from Ratatat, released on August 22, 2006. As with their first album, Classics is almost entirely instrumental, with the only exception being a large cat-like sound sample used in "Wildcat."

During a September 15, 2006 interview on radio station KEXP, the band revealed that part of the album was recorded in upstate New York in a house owned by Björk.

This album produced three singles: "Lex", "Wildcat", and "Loud Pipes".

The track "Tropicana" was featured in the 2007 film Knocked Up and "Loud Pipes" was featured in the video game MLB 07: The Show.

Track listing

References

External links

Ratatat albums
2006 albums
XL Recordings albums
Albums produced by E*vax